Star Movies is an Asian pay television network owned by multiple Disney International Operations. Star Movies was originally launched as a single channel broadcast across Asia, but it was regionalised into different localised channels since then. Fox Networks Group Asia Pacific have since rebranded some of the network's international feeds in Hong Kong, Taiwan (SD feed only) and Southeast Asia as Fox Movies, but retains the Star Movies brand in Mainland China (Hong Kong), Taiwan (HD feed), Middle East & South Asia (except Maldives).

Star India continues to operate the Indian feed of the network as a channel specialized in Western films, while the Middle Eastern feed, operated by Fox Networks Group Middle East, co-exists with Fox Movies. Star Movies HD in Taiwan is operated by Disney Networks Group Taiwan which was the advertisement-free offering of Fox Movies Taiwan. However, from March 2021 Star Movies Taiwan started doing short advertisement breaks in between movies. Star Movies in Middle East is operated by Fox Network Group Middle East.

History
STAR Movies was split up from STAR Plus on 1 May 1994, which usually aired movies in the early years of STAR TV from 1991 to 1994. At launch, its programming lineup was consisted of both Hollywood and Chinese films and catered to pan-Asian audiences.

As Star TV planned to remove BBC World Service Television from its channel lineup for Northeast Asia by mid-April 1994, the company planned to replace it with a Chinese-language film channel. Star Movies would focus on Western world films from then on. Star TV has since regionalized the channel's operation.

A localised feed intended for the Philippines was launched on 1 January 2010. Four months later, a high-definition channel, Star Movies HD, was launched. A video on demand channel was also launched on 16 September of that same year.

On 1 January 2012, Star Movies was rebranded as Fox Movies Premium and available in Hong Kong, the Maldives and most of Southeast Asia.

On 10 June 2017, the Philippine feed of the channel was rebranded as Fox Movies Philippines.

On 1 November 2017, the Vietnamese feed of Star Movies was rebranded as Fox Movies Vietnam.

On 1 October 2021, Star Movies China officially shut down its transmission.

On 1 January 2022, Fox Movies Taiwan was rebranded to Star Movies Gold. Star Movies HD will remain active and it kept its own programming and its own logo.

Programming
Star Movies has first-run contracts for movies distributed by Disney (20th Century Studios, Pixar, Marvel Studios) and sub-run contracts for movies from  countries where Star Movies is available. It also features movies from other movie distributors including Lionsgate, Summit Entertainment and The Weinstein Company. Star Movies mainly airs Disney movies during the daytime hours. Star Movies India does fewer premieres compared to sometimes showing programs like Masterchef Australia and pushing more premium movies into their OTT platform Disney+ Hotstar.

Operating channels

Current

Star Movies India 

Star Movies India is distributed by Walt Disney Studios, Pixar, Marvel Studios and 20th Century Studios in India, Nepal, Sri Lanka and Bangladesh and is ad supported. Movie premieres are less frequent compared to other feeds

Available language audio feed In Hindi, Tamil and Telugu. The channel ceased broadcasting in Sri Lanka from 1 February 2015 due to content rights issues, leaving the country with no Star Movies or Fox Movies channel. The channel was relaunched in Sri Lanka in 2019 after 4 years.

Star Movies Select HD was launched in 2015 showcasing niche films.

Star Movies MENA 
Star Movies Middle East and Africa features a hardcoded Arabic-language subtitle track (except for Israel). The channel is available on both OSN and beIN.

Star Movies Gold and HD Taiwan 
An ad-supported feed of Star Movies was launched for Taiwan specifically. It was the most localised feed of the television network, since most voice-overs in promotions for up-coming movies were done in Mandarin Chinese. The SD feed of the channel was rebranded as Fox Movies Taiwan on 18 January 2018, while the HD feed still retains is independent programming and branding. On January 1, 2022, Fox Movies Taiwan was rebranded to Star Movies Gold.

Defunct

Star Movies Asia 
Star Movies Asia was formerly broadcast in Southeast Asia, parts of South Asia and China as a single, ad-free channel.

In 2017 until 2021, Star Movies Asia is limited to subscribers in China due to the gradual rebrand of the channel's localised feeds to Fox Movies Premium and later Fox Movies.

Star Movies Vietnam used to air a program called "Thảm đỏ (Red Carpet)" to introduce the movies which are scheduled to broadcast on the channel, all in Vietnamese language and hosted by Vietnamese presenters.

After the rebranding of Star Movies to Fox Movies Premium, Nepal, Bangladesh and Sri Lanka were switched over to the ad supported Indian version of Star Movies.

It ceases operations on 1 October 2021, after which the channel space created by BBC World Service Television in 1991, folded and ceased to exist.

Star Movies Philippines 
Star Movies was launched on 30 November 2009 in the Philippines as an ad-supported channel. It used to simulcast with the Southeast Asian and Chinese feeds until 31 December 2009, when a localised feed was launched specifically for the Philippines. After the rebranding of Star Movies Asia as Fox Movies Premium on 1 January 2012 in most of Southeast Asia, the Philippine feed remained broadcasting until 10 June 2017 when it followed suit.

Star Movies Action 
It was launched on 2 June 2013 only in India, replacing Fox Action Movies (not to be confused with its Southeast Asian counterpart) after its temporal closedown on 11 May 2013. The channel airs action- and horror-themed movies. In 2017, the channel was shut down.

See also
Fox Movies Southeast Asia
Fox Family Movies
Fox Action Movies

References

External links
 

Disney television networks
Movie channels in Taiwan
Television channels and stations established in 1994
English-language television stations in India
Disney Star